Granny O'Grimm's Sleeping Beauty is a six-minute-long CG/flash animated socially satirical black comedy short film written by Kathleen O'Rourke, directed by Nicky Phelan and produced by Darragh O'Connell of Brown Bag Films in 2008. The plot centers on Granny O'Grimm, a seemingly sweet old lady, who loses the plotline as she tells her own version of Sleeping Beauty to her terrified granddaughter. The short was nominated for the Academy Award for Best Animated Short Film at the 82nd Academy Awards but lost to Logorama.

Plot

Production
Granny O'Grimm started life as a character in a sketch in The Fallen Angels Cabaret, a comedy show in which creator Kathleen O'Rourke was involved. There it was developed and performed, development continuing later with John Walsh and Kathleen. Director Nicky Phelan saw Granny O'Grimm's potential as an animated character and, with Brown Bag Films, production began in 2008. Kathleen O'Rourke reprised her role to voice the character in the short film. The film received funding from the Irish Film Board, RTÉ and the Arts Council through the ‘Frameworks’ scheme. It has received 11 national and international awards including the Newport Beach Film Festival (Outstanding Achievement in Short Films), Cinegael Montreal (Audience Award, Best Short) and the Heart of Gold Film Festival, Australia (Best Comedy).

Awards and nominations
In January 2010, the film's Director, Nicky Phelan and Producer Darragh O'Connell were nominated for Best Animated Short Film at the 82nd Academy Awards ending up losing to Logorama. It was also included in the Animation Show of Shows.

References

External links
Official Site 

 Granny O'Grimm's Sleeping Beauty

2008 films
2008 animated films
2008 short films
2000s animated short films
English-language Irish films
Fairy tale parody films
Films based on Sleeping Beauty
Irish animated short films
2008 black comedy films
2008 comedy films
Irish black comedy films
2000s English-language films